Bhalobasar Rong is a Bangladeshi Bengali-language film. Directed by Shahin Sumon, it stars Bappy Chowdhury, Mahiya Mahi, Amit Hasan, Abdur Razzak and many more. It is a remake of 2010 Telugu film Baava.

Cast
 Mahiya Mahi as Mahi/Faria
 Bappy Chowdhury as Bappy
 Abdur Razzak as Samsuddin Chowdhury (Mahi/Faria's grandfather)
 Amit Hasan as villain
 Ali Raj as Bappi's father
 Kabila
 Mizu Ahmed

Music
Music of the movie was produced by Jaaz Multimedia.

References

External links
 

2012 films
2012 romantic drama films
Bengali-language Bangladeshi films
Bangladeshi romantic drama films
Films scored by Shawkat Ali Emon
Films scored by Ali Akram Shuvo
Bangladeshi remakes of Indian films
2010s Bengali-language films
Bangladeshi remakes of Telugu films
Jaaz Multimedia films